In computing, self-contained system  (SCS)  is a software architecture approach that focuses on a separation of the functionality into many independent systems, making the complete logical system a collaboration of many smaller software systems.

Self-contained system characteristics

SCS have certain characteristics:

Each SCS is an autonomous web application. 
Each SCS is owned by one team. 
Communication with other SCSs or third-party systems is asynchronous wherever possible.
An SCS can have an optional service API.
Each SCS must include data and logic.
An SCS should make its features usable to end-users by its own UI.
To avoid tight coupling an SCS should share no business code with other SCSs.
Shared infrastructure should be reduced to increase availability and decrease coupling.

Implementations create larger systems using this approach – in particular web applications. There are many case studies and further links available.

Self-contained systems and microservices

While self-contained systems are similar to microservices there are differences: A system will usually contain fewer SCS than microservices. Also microservices can communicate with other microservices – even synchronously. SCS prefer no communication or asynchronous communication. Microservices might also have a separate UI unlike the SCS that include a UI.

Usage

There are quite a few known usages of SCS – e.g. at Otto and Galeria Kaufhof.

References

Architectural pattern (computer science)